HMS Onslow was an O-class destroyer of the Royal Navy. The O-class were intermediate destroyers, designed before the outbreak of the Second World War to meet likely demands for large number of destroyers. Onslow was ordered on 2 October 1939 and was built by John Brown & Company at their  Clydebank, Glasgow shipyard, launching on 31 March 1941 and completing on 8 October 1941.

Onslow served with the Home Fleet during the war, with a major activity being escorting Arctic Convoys to the Soviet Union. She sank the German submarine  in September 1942 and in December that year took part in the Battle of the Barents Sea in 1942, while escorting Convoy JW 51B to Russia. The convoy escorts held off attacks from the powerful , with Onslow being heavily damaged and her captain, Robert Sherbrooke, severely injured. She also saw detached service in the Mediterranean, covering the Malta Convoy Operation Harpoon in June 1942, and protected invasion shipping in the English Channel from German attack before and after the Normandy landings in mid-1944.

The ship was sold to the Pakistan Navy in 1948, and was renamed Tippu Sultan. Tippu Sultan was converted to a Type 16 anti-submarine frigate from 1957 to 1959, and took part in the 1965 and 1971 wars with India, remaining in service until 1980.

Design
The O-class (and the following P-class) were designed prior to the outbreak of the Second World War to meet the Royal navy's need for large numbers of destroyers in the event of war occurring. They were an intermediate between the large destroyers designed for fleet operations (such as the Tribal-class) and the smaller and slower Hunt-class escort destroyers.

Displacement was  standard and  full load. Onslow was configured as a leader for a destroyer flotilla, and as such had a crew of 217 officers and men.

Onslow had a main gun armament of four 45-calibre 4.7-inch (120 mm) Mark IX guns in single mounts. The ship was designed to carry two quadruple 21-inch (533 mm) torpedo tubes, but early experience of the vulnerability of destroyers to air attack off Norway and during the evacuation from Dunkirk in 1940 resulted in the armament of the O-class being revised during construction, with the aft set of torpedo-tubes removed and replaced by a single 4 in (102 mm) QF Mark V anti-aircraft gun, although the 4-inch gun was later removed and the second bank of torpedo tubes re-instated. Onslow was completed with a close-in anti-aircraft armament of one quadruple 2-pounder "pom-pom" mount together with four single Oerlikon 20 mm cannon, with two on the bridge wings and two further aft abreast the searchlight platform. After April 1943, the single Oerlikon mounts abreast the searchlights were replaced by twin mounts. Four depth charge throwers were fitted, with 60 depth charges carried.

Onslow was refitted and rearmed in 1948 as part of her sale to Pakistan. More modern fire control equipment was fitted and the Oerlikon guns were replaced by single Bofors 40 mm anti-aircraft guns, with a twin Bofors 40 mm mount replacing the quadruple pom-pom. Between 1957 and 1959, the ship was refitted as a Type 16 frigate, which resulted in a completely revised armament being fitted. A twin 4 inch gun was mounted forward with a close-in anti-aircraft armament of five Bofors 40 mm guns (one twin and three singles). Anti-submarine armament consisted of two Squid anti-submarine mortars, while a quadruple set of 21-inch torpedo tubes were fitted.

Service history
The ship was ordered as part of the Second Emergency Flotilla as Packenham on 2 October 1939, at a contract price of £416,770 (excluding government provided equipment such as armament), and was laid down at John Brown & Company's Clydebank shipyard on 1 July 1940. In early 1941, the ship swapped names with the destroyer Onslow, also under construction, and was launched as Onslow on 31 March 1941. Onslow was damaged by a bomb during an air raid on 3 June 1941, delaying completion by about a month. Onslow commissioned on 23 September 1941, with construction completing on 8 October 1941.

1941
Attached to the Home Fleet, Onslow served mostly as an escort to Arctic convoys. After work-up, Onslow joined the 17 Destroyer Flotilla as leader. On 24 November 1941, Onslow, together with sister ship  and the cruiser , joined Arctic convoy Convoy PQ 4, escorting the convoy until being relieved by locally-based ships on 27 November. The convoy continued on to Arkhangelsk, while Berwick, Onslow and Offa proceeded to the naval base at Murmansk. They were attacked by German bombers on entering the Kola Inlet on 28 November, and Onslow was slightly damaged by a near miss.

The force arrived at its destination on 27 December, and while Commandos landed on the islands, Onslow and Oribi attacked a coastal convoy, sinking driving aground four merchant ships (and ) and boarding the Vorpostenboot  (an armed trawler) Föhn, capturing coding wheels and bigram tables for the Enigma cypher machine, before sinking Föhn. More codebreaking material was captured later that day when Offa and Chiddingfold boarded and sunk the armed trawler Donner while sinking the cargo ship .

1942
On 1 January 1942, Onslow rescued 23 survivors from the British merchant ship , torpedoed the previous day by the German submarine . In early March 1942, Onslow sailed with the main body Home Fleet as part of the distant escort to the Arctic Convoys QP 8 and PQ 12. The  sortied in an attempt to intercept one of the convoys, while the distant escort, including Onslow, searched for Tirpitz. Poor weather ensured that Tirpitz failed to find the convoy and the Home Fleet forces failed to find Tirpitz although the German battleship was later unsuccessfully attacked by aircraft from the carrier . Later that month Onslow took part in similar distant escort operations for the Arctic Convoys PQ 13 and PQ 14. On 21 May, the Arctic Convoy PQ 16 of 35 Merchant ships left Reykjavík in Iceland. It has an ocean escort of six destroyers and four corvettes, with a close covering force of three cruiser and the destroyers Onslow, Offa and Oribi joining on 23 May. The cruiser force, including Onslow left PQ 16 on 26 May to cover the westbound convoy QP 12. In total PQ 16 lost seven merchant ships before it reached Russian ports, while QP 12 was unharmed.

In June 1942, much of the Home Fleet was detached to the Mediterranean to take part in Operation Harpoon, an attempt to run one supply convoy to Malta from the west, while a second convoy headed to Malta from Egypt (Operation Vigorous). Force W joined the Harpoon convoy shortly after it entered the Mediterranean on 12 June, and remained with it until turning back, as planned, as the convoy reached the Strait of Sicily on the evening of 14 June. After her return to British waters, Onslow formed part of the distant escort for Arctic convoy PQ 17 and the return convoy QP 13. PQ 17 was ordered to be scattered and its close escort withdrawn based on mistaken intelligence that the Tirpitz was about to attack the convoy, which resulted in extremely heavy losses to the unprotected merchant ships, with 24 of the 25 merchant ships being sunk by German submarines and aircraft. In August 1942, Onslow was employed in escorting units of the Home Fleet returning to British waters from Gibraltar after another Malta Convoy, Operation Pedestal.

September 1942 saw the running of the next Arctic Convoy, PQ 18. The events of PQ 17 resulted in the decision to give the convoy a very strong escort. As well as the normal close escort, for most of the convoy's route it would be accompanied by the Escort carrier , and by a "Fighting Destroyer Escort" consisting of 16 destroyers led by the light cruiser . This force was backed up by a cruiser covering force, with more distant cover provided by the battleships of the Home Fleet. Onslow formed part of the Fighting Destroyer Escort, which joined the convoy on 9 September. The convoy came under heavy attack by German submarine and aircraft from 13 September, and on 14 September a Swordfish aircraft from Avenger spotted the German submarine  on the surface. Onslow was despatched against the submarine and carried out a series of depth charge attacks over three hours, sinking the submarine. The carrier and Fighting Destroyer Escort remained with PQ 18 until 16 September, when it transferred to the westbound Convoy QP 14 to escort it through the area of most danger, with Onslow leaving QP 14 on 25 September. In total, 13 ships out of 40 from PQ 18 were sunk, with the escort sinking three U-boats and claiming 41 German aircraft shot down. Three more merchant ships and a fleet oiler were lost from QP 14.

On 8 November 1942, the British and Americans landed in French North Africa in Operation Torch, with Onslow being employed in escorting follow-up convoys following the initial assault.

In December 1942, Onslow took part in Arctic Convoy JW 51B, joining the convoy on 25 December, with Captain Robert Sherbrooke taking charge of the convoy's close escort of six destroyers, two corvettes, one minesweeper and two trawlers. Five merchant ships, together with the destroyer Oribi and one of the trawlers, were separated from the convoy by bad weather shortly afterwards. The German force split into two, with Hipper and three destroyers attacking from the northwest and Lutzow and the other three destroyers from the south, with the intention that the escort would be drawn off to the first attacker, leaving the convoy unprotected. The Germans attacked on 31 December, in the Battle of the Barents Sea. Sherbrooke in Onslow led the other destroyers in dummy torpedo attacks against Hipper in order to force the cruiser to keep from closing, while laying a smoke-screen to protect the convoy. After about 40 minutes, Onslow was hit by three shells from Hipper and near missed by a fourth, and badly damaged. Two guns were put out of action and a serious fire started, while 17 members of Onslows crew were killed, and 23 wounded, including Sherbrooke. Later, Achates sank after being hit by Hipper, and Obedient damaged, before the arrival of the British cruisers  and  changed the course of the battle, damaging Hipper and sinking the destroyer Friedrich Eckoldt before the Germans withdrew. The convoy had been saved, for the cost of the loss of Achates and the minesweeper Bramble. Sherbrooke was awarded the Victoria Cross for his actions in the battle.

1943–45
After temporary repairs at Murmansk, Onslow returned to Britain as part of Convoy RA 52 at the end of January 1943, then was repaired at a commercial shipyard in Kingston upon Hull, rejoining the fleet at the end of April that year. In early November 1943, Onslow formed part of the distant escort for Convoy RA 54A on its return from Russia, and then took part in the close escort of Convoy JW 54A from 18 to 24 November and in the close escort of the return Convoy RA 54B from 28 November to 5 December, with none of the convoys being attacked by German forces. From 22 to 29 December, Onslow formed part of the escort for Convoy JW 55B. The convoy itself was not affected. Onslow returned to Britain as part of the escort of Convoy RA 55B from 1 January to 7 January 1944.

Onslow was refitted on the Tyne from 18 January to 22 February 1944. In March, she carried out operations in the English Channel before returning to the Home Fleet to form part of the very strong escort for the Arctic Convoy JW 58 from 29 March to 4 April, and for the return convoy RA 58 from 7 to 13 April. She was then again deployed to the Channel for patrol and escort duties in preparation for the upcoming invasion of France. On the night of 27–28 April 1944, nine German S-boats (motor torpedo boats) attacked a convoy of American landing craft on exercise in Lyme Bay, sinking two and damaging another. Onslow, on patrol in the Channel, was diverted in an unsuccessful attempt to search for the German boats, followed by searching for survivors and bodies in Lyme Bay.

The Invasion of Normandy on 6 June 1944, saw Onslow deployed in screening the invasion force as part of Operation Neptune. On 18 June, Onslow was hit by a German air-dropped torpedo which failed to explode, again causing slight damage, with the ship being under repair (from both this damage and that of 6/7 June) for 5 days. On 12 August, Onslow, together with the cruiser  and the destroyer  sank the German auxiliary minesweeper Sperrbrecher 7 near La Rochelle.

In September 1944, Onslow returned to duty with the Home Fleet, including continued duty on Arctic convoys. From 22 October to 28 October, Onslow formed part of the escort of Convoy JW 61, and from 2 November to 7 November, part of the escort for the return convoy RA 61. In December 1944, Onslow formed part of the escort for Convoy JW 62 and the return convoy RA 62.

They attacked a German convoy off Egersund, sinking the minesweeper  and shelling the merchant ships  and Charlotte, which were abandoned and sank. Onslow rescued one man from Bluebell, the only survivor from the sinking.

Post-War activities
On 12 May 1945, Onslow sailed as part of Convoy JW 67 to Russia, and on the return Convoy RA 67 which left the Kola Inlet on 23 May. Although the war in Europe had ended on 8 May, these last Arctic convoys were still provided with a substantial escort to guard against attacks from submarines that did not obey the German order to surrender. On 5–7 June 1945, Onslow escorted the cruiser Norfolk, carrying King Haakon VII of Norway back from exile to Oslo. In August 1945, Onslow attended the first British Navy week in a foreign port, in Rotterdam. Also there were the cruiser HMS Bellona, and the destroyer Garth as well as the submarine Tuna. Foreign vessels included two of the Dutch Navy submarines of the T-class, Dolfijn and Zeehond.

In November–December 1945 she was the headquarter ship for Operation Deadlight, supervising the movement U-boats from Loch Ryan for scuttling off the coast of Ireland. She was placed into Care and Maintenance status at Devonport in January 1946, with it being planned to use her as a target ship.

Pakistan service

In 1948, the newly established Pakistan Navy sought to acquire two 4.7-inch gunned destroyers from Britain, and purchased Onslow and Offa for a total price of £605,000 for the two ships. Onslow was transferred to Pakistan on 30 September 1948 at Plymouth, becoming Tippu Sultan. In 1954 she underwent a refit at Malta. Between 1957 and 1959 she underwent conversion to a Type 16 frigate by Grayson Rollo and Clover Docks at Birkenhead, England, with the conversion paid for by the US under the Mutual Defense Assistance Act.

Tippu Sultan was active during the 1965 war with India, which broke out in September, taking part in a bombardment by the cruiser Babur and six destroyers of the Indian city of Dwarka on 8 September. She carried out patrols during the 1971 war. Tippu Sultan was stricken from the Pakistan Navy until 1980, after which her hull was used as a Hulk.

Pennant numbers

See also
 Alan Ross

Notes

References

Further reading

External links

 

O and P-class destroyers
Ships built on the River Clyde
1941 ships
World War II destroyers of the United Kingdom
O-class destroyers of the Pakistan Navy